4th and 26 was an American football play on Sunday, January 11, 2004, during the National Football League's (NFL) 2003–04 playoffs.  The play occurred during the fourth quarter of a divisional playoff game between the visiting Green Bay Packers and the Philadelphia Eagles at Lincoln Financial Field in Philadelphia, Pennsylvania.

Background

The NFC East champion and top-seeded Eagles were coming off an opening round bye while the fourth-seeded, NFC North champion Packers were the visiting team, coming off an 33–27 overtime win over the Seattle Seahawks in the NFC Wild Card playoffs courtesy of a pick-six by former Eagle Al Harris. Both teams met earlier in the season in which the Eagles managed to win in Green Bay 17–14 with a Donovan McNabb touchdown pass to Todd Pinkston with under 30 seconds remaining in what was mostly a defensively-contested game. This was the second postseason meeting between the Packers and Eagles, the previous meeting was back in the 1960 NFL Championship Game, which the Eagles won 17–13.

Game summary

Midway through the first quarter, Packers linebacker Nick Barnett recovered a fumble from Eagles' quarterback Donovan McNabb on the Eagles' 40-yard line, and Green Bay quarterback Brett Favre threw a 40-yard touchdown pass to Robert Ferguson on the next play. James Thrash returned the ensuing kickoff 36 yards to the 44-yard line. Then McNabb made up for his mistake with a 41-yard run to the Packers 15. But the drive stalled at the 14-yard line and ended with no points when David Akers missed a 30-yard field goal attempt. After the missed field goal, Ahman Green rushed three times for 31 yards before Favre threw his second touchdown pass to Ferguson, giving the Packers a 14–0 lead with 1:16 left in the first quarter.

In the second quarter, McNabb led the Eagles on a scoring drive, completing five consecutive passes for 77 yards, including a 45-yard pass to Todd Pinkston. On the last play, his 7-yard touchdown pass to Duce Staley cut it to 14–7. Green Bay took the kickoff and drove 67 yards to the Eagles' 1-yard line, featuring a 33-yard run by Green, but on fourth down, Green tripped on guard Mike Wahle's leg and was tackled for no gain. The Packers turned the ball over on downs.

Late in the third quarter, the Eagles drove 88 yards in 8 plays to tie the game, despite two 10-yard penalties against them on the drive. McNabb was responsible for all of the yards on the drive, rushing for 37 yards and completing four passes for 72, including a 12-yard touchdown pass to Pinkston that tied the game at 14 on the first play of the fourth quarter.

Later, Antonio Chatman's 10-yard punt return gave the Packers great field position on their own 49-yard line. On the next play, Favre threw a 44-yard completion to Javon Walker. Philadelphia's defense kept Green Bay out of the end zone, but Ryan Longwell kicked a 21-yard field goal to give them a 17–14 lead.

The play
The drive started with a 22-yard run by Duce Staley, but on the next play, McNabb threw for an incomplete pass. Subsequently, on second down the Eagles were penalized 5 yards for a false start. On the ensuing play, a sack pushed the Eagles back to their own 26 yard line, and on third down McNabb threw another incompletion. The Eagles, faced with a fourth down and 26 yards, needed to convert for a first down, with only 1:12 remaining and one timeout left. The pass to Freddie Mitchell was completed for 28 yards (2 more than was needed for the 1st down).

On fourth down, the play (74 Double Go) called for a slant route to wide receiver Freddie Mitchell. McNabb threw a perfect strike to Mitchell deep into the Packers' secondary. The Packers' coverage, a Cover 2 package, broke down and was sharply criticized by broadcaster Cris Collinsworth. Linebacker Nick Barnett, who was responsible for shallow coverage of Mitchell, bit on the tight end. Inexplicably, Darren Sharper, who was partially responsible for deep coverage of Mitchell, played past the first down marker positioning himself for an interception rather than preventing any catch in front of the marker. The only player that was close to making a play, Packers' safety Bhawoh Jue, was playing the sidelines as is customary in Cover 2 defense and was too late to prevent a catch or first down. Mitchell completed a leaping reception and was brought down at the Packers 46, giving the Eagles a first down.  Broadcaster Joe Buck criticized the spot of the ball, as it appeared from the broadcast that Mitchell barely crossed the line to gain, but the officials gave him some extra yards.

After another first down on a McNabb run, David Akers made a game-tying, 37-yard field goal, which sent the game into overtime.  In the extra period, Eagles safety Brian Dawkins intercepted an errant Brett Favre pass and returned it 35 yards.  This set up Akers for a 31-yard, game-winning field goal attempt. Akers made this kick to give the Eagles the 20–17 victory.

Aftermath
Packers defensive coordinator Ed Donatell was fired on January 16, 2004, five days after the game. The Eagles' win advanced them to the NFC Championship Game, which they lost to the Carolina Panthers, 14–3, ending their season.

The Packers and Eagles met during the  regular season game in Philadelphia, in which the Packers had won six straight games and the Eagles started the season 11–1.  The Packers hoped to gain revenge from their heartbreaking playoff loss, but the Eagles dominated this game, winning 47–17 after jumping out to a 35–0 lead. McNabb recorded five touchdowns and a franchise record 464 passing yards in the game.  Both teams won their respective divisions in 2004 and returned to the playoffs.  The Packers lost in the Wild Card round to the Minnesota Vikings, while the Eagles advanced to Super Bowl XXXIX, their first Super Bowl appearance in 24 years, but lost to the New England Patriots.   

In 2011 and 2012, the 4th and 26 play was noted in respective articles published in Advanced Football Analytics and the Journal of Quantitative Analysis in Sports. Both articles discussed the author's use of a Markov chain to estimate the probability of a series of football events. As the author wrote, "What are the odds that a drive containing a 4th-and-26 from the 25 would end with a successful field goal? According to the Markov model, a whopping 1 out of 175." 

Prior to a  meeting in Philadelphia, the Eagles' scoreboard operator posted "4th and 26" as the down and distance to remind the Packers and their fans of that play.  However, the Packers went on to win this game, 27–13.

In 2019, during the NFL's celebration of its 100th season, the NFL listed the "4th and 26" game as #69 on its list of the NFL's 100 greatest games.

Officials 
Referee: Ed Hochuli (#85)
Umpire: Steve Wilson (#29)
Head Linesman: Mark Hittner (#28)
Line Judge: Mark Perlman (#9)
Field Judge: Tom Sifferman (#118)
Side Judge: Bill Vinovich (#52)
Back Judge: Bill Schmitz (#122)

See also 

Philly Special
Miracle at the Meadowlands 
Miracle at the New Meadowlands
Miracle in Motown

References

External links
 

2003 National Football League season
National Football League playoff games
Green Bay Packers postseason
Philadelphia Eagles postseason
American football incidents
January 2004 sports events in the United States
2004 in sports in Pennsylvania
2004 in Philadelphia
Culture of Philadelphia